This is a list of notable events in Latin music (i.e. Spanish- and Portuguese-speaking music from Latin America, Europe, and the United States) that took place in 2004.

Events
July 13 — Puerto Rican rapper  Daddy Yankee releases his third studio album, Barrio Fino which  becomes the best-selling Tropical Album of 2004 and the best-selling Latin Album and Tropical Album by Billboard of the 2000s decade. It became the first album to reach #1 on the Billboard Latin Rhythm Albums chart. The album won the Lo Nuestro and the Latin Grammy Award for Best Urban Music Album in 2005 and was certified five times by the RIAA. The critical and commercial success of the album popularized reggaeton into the mainstream media.
September 1 — The 5th Annual Latin Grammy Awards are held at the Shrine Auditorium in Los Angeles, California.
Alejandro Sanz is the biggest winner at the award ceremony receiving four awards including Record of the Year and  Song of the Year for "No Es lo Mismo" and Album of the Year for No Es lo Mismo.
Maria Rita wins Best New Artist.
Mexican-American musician Carlos Santana is honored as the Latin Recording Academy Person of the Year

Number-ones albums and singles by country
List of number-one singles of 2004 (Spain)
List of number-one Billboard Top Latin Albums of 2004
List of number-one Billboard Tropical Albums of 2004
List of number-one Billboard Latin Pop Albums of 2004
List of number-one Billboard Hot Latin Songs of 2004
List of number-one Billboard Hot Tropical Songs of 2004
List of number-one Billboard Hot Latin Pop Songs of 2004

Awards
2004 Premio Lo Nuestro
2004 Billboard Latin Music Awards
2004 Latin Grammy Awards
2004 Tejano Music Awards

Albums released

First quarter

January

February

March

Second quarter

April

May

June

Third quarter

July

August

September

Fourth quarter

October

November

December

Unknown release dates

Best-selling records

Best-selling albums
The following is a list of the top 10 best-selling Latin albums in the United States in 2004, according to Billboard.

Best-performing songs
The following is a list of the top 10 best-performing Latin songs in the United States in 2004, according to Billboard.

Deaths
 March 27 – Adán Sánchez, Mexican singer (b. 1984)

References 

 
Latin music by year